Nandigama mandal is one of the 20 mandals in NTR district of the Indian state of Andhra Pradesh. It is under the administration of Nandigama revenue division and the headquarters are located at Nandigama. The mandal is bounded Penuganchiprolu, Kanchikacherla, Chandarlapadu mandals and also a portion of it by the state of Telangana.

Administration 
The mandal is partially a part of the Andhra Pradesh Capital Region under the jurisdiction of APCRDA.

Towns and villages 

 census, the mandal has 26 settlements, which includes 1 town and 25 villages.

The settlements in the mandal are listed below:

Note: †-Mandal headquarter

See also 
List of villages in Krishna district

References 

Mandals in NTR district